The 2010 Marion Mayhem season was the fifth season for the Continental Indoor Football League (CIFL) franchise, and the team's last season, as they would fail to be able to finish the season, and forfeit their last 4 games of the 2010 season. On December 24, 2009, team announced their intentions to move the Mayhem franchise to Columbus, Ohio and become the Columbus Aces before the season, citing a lack of attendance as the reason for the move. The move fell through, and the team played the 2010 season in Marion. After starting the season 3-3, the Mayhem folded, rewarding the teams that had yet to play them with victories.

Standings

Schedule

Roster

Stats

Passing

Rushing

Receiving

Regular season

Week 3: vs Cincinnati Commandos

Week 4: vs. Chicago Cardinals

Week 5: vs. Chicago Cardinals

Week 7: vs. Wisconsin Wolfpack

Week 8: vs. Miami Valley Silverbacks

Week 9: vs. Cincinnati Commandos

Week 10: vs. Fort Wayne FireHawks

Week 12: vs. Fort Wayne FireHawks

Week 13: vs. Wisconsin Wolfpack

Week 14: vs. Miami Valley Silverbacks

References

2010 Continental Indoor Football League season
Marion Mayhem
Marion Mayhem